The Church of St Mary the Blessed Virgin in Garforth, West Yorkshire, England is an active Anglican parish church in the archdeaconry of Leeds and the Diocese of Leeds.

History
The church was built to a design by George Fowler Jones and was completed in 1844.

Architectural style
The church is of dressed magnesian limestone with a slate roof.  The church has a cruciform layout with a crossing tower and broach spire.  The church has a buttressed three-bay north nave with south aisles.  The church has a gabled porch to its south side.

See also
List of places of worship in the City of Leeds

References

External links
St Mary's Church, Garforth

Churches in Leeds
Listed buildings in Leeds
Anglican Diocese of Leeds
Church of England church buildings in West Yorkshire
Grade II listed churches in West Yorkshire
Gothic Revival architecture in Leeds
St Mary's Church